TKKF Stilon Gorzów Wielkopolski is a Polish women's football club from Gorzów Wielkopolski.

TKKF Stilon was founded in 1984 and won 3 championship titles and 3 Polish Cups. The last years Gorzów Wielkopolski played in Poland's I Liga, which was the highest league up to 2005-06 but since then only the second tier. Gorzów Wielkopolski hasn't been able to promote to the new Ekstraliga Kobiet until 2009-10 when they finished second at the end of the season.

Accomplishments 
 Polish Championship: 1992, 1995, 1996
 Polish Cup: 1991, 1992, 1993

References 

Women's football clubs in Poland
Sport in Gorzów Wielkopolski
Association football clubs established in 1984
1984 establishments in Poland